Alpha is an unincorporated community located in Lewis County, Washington. The town rests alongside Washington State Route 508, between Cinebar, 3.5 miles away to the east, and Onalaska to the west.

A post office existed from 1890 to 1954 but due to its rural setting with little settlement concentration, it did not meet qualifications as a Census Designated Place, a program used by the U.S. Census Bureau for unincorporated communities. Alpha appears on the Mayfield Lake U.S. Geological Survey Map.

The area has been named Alpha Prairie, Shoestring, and Tilton, with the current iteration chosen by either a local postmaster after the Greek letter or by settler Harold Hanson.

Government and politics

Politics

Alpha is recognized as being majority Republican and conservative.

The results for the 2020 U.S. Presidential Election for the Alpha voting district were as follows:

 Donald J. Trump (Republican) - 594 (70.97%)
 Joe Biden (Democrat) - 220 (26.28%)
 Jo Jorgensen (Libertarian) - 16 (1.91%)
 Howie Hawkins (Green) - 3 (0.36%)
 Write-in candidate - 4 (0.48%)

References

Unincorporated communities in Lewis County, Washington
Unincorporated communities in Washington (state)